Silicon photomultipliers, often called "SiPM" in the literature, are solid-state single-photon-sensitive devices based on Single-photon avalanche diode (SPAD) implemented on common silicon substrate. The dimension of each single SPAD can vary from 10 to 100 micrometres, and their density can be up to 10000 per square millimeter. Every SPAD in SiPM operates in Geiger mode and is coupled with the others by a metal or polysilicon quenching resistor. Although the device works in digital/switching mode, most of SiPM are an analog device because all the microcells are read in parallel, making it possible to generate signals within a dynamic range from a single photon to 1000 photons for a device with just a square-millimeter area. More advanced readout schemes are utilized for the lidar applications. The supply voltage (Vb) depends on APD technology used and typically varies between 20 V and 100 V, thus being from 15 to 75 times lower than the voltage required for a traditional photomultiplier tube's (PMT) operation.

Typical specifications for a SiPM:
 Photo detection efficiency (PDE) ranges from 20 to 50%, depending on device and wavelength, being similar to a traditional PMT
 Gain (G) is also similar to a PMT, being about 106
 G vs. Vb dependence is linear and does not follow a power law like in the case of PMTs
 Timing jitter is optimized to have a photon arrival time resolution of about 100-300 ps
 Signal decay time is inversely proportional to square root of photoelectrons number within an excitation event
 The signal parameters are practically independent of external magnetic fields, in contrast to vacuum PMTs
 Afterpulsing probability (3-30%), defined as probability of spurious second pulses after single photon arrival
 Dark count density is frequency of pulses in absence of illumination (105-106 pulses/s/mm2)
 Small dimensions and lower voltages permit extremely compact, light and robust mechanical design

SiPM for medical imaging are attractive candidates for the replacement of the conventional PMT in PET and SPECT imaging, since they provide high gain with low voltage and fast response, they are very compact and compatible with magnetic resonance setups. Nevertheless, there are still several challenges, for example, SiPM requires optimization for larger matrices, signal amplification and digitization.

Comparison to vacuum tube photomultipliers

Advantages
Compared to conventional PMTs, the photoelectron gain is typically more deterministic, resulting in low or even negligible excess noise factor.  As a result, the SNR (Signal/Noise Ratio) for a fixed number of detected photons can be higher than a PMT.   Conversely, the stochastic gain of a PMT typically requires more detected photons to obtain the same SNR. 

Mass production of silicon electronics by multiple vendors allows SiPMs to be made very cheaply relative to vacuum tubes.

Bias voltages are 10-100x times lower, simplifying electronics. 

In the red to near-infrared, silicon enables much higher quantum efficiency than available PMT photocathode materials.

Dynamic range can be orders of magnitude larger than a PMT if large numbers of SPADs are arrayed together, enabling faster imaging rates or higher SNR without saturation.

Disadvantages 
Dark current is typically much higher at a given temperature than a PMT.  Thus, a SiPM may require subambient cooling while a PMT used in the same application may not, resulting in increased complexity and cost.  Similarly, obtaining large active areas may be difficult due to higher dark counts per area than PMTs.

The impulse response of a SiPM has a complex, multiexponential shape.  Relative to a PMT, obtaining a symmetric pulse shape or uniform frequency response may require more complex analog filtering or pulse shaping electronics.

Comparison to avalanche photodiodes
Conventional avalanche photodiodes (APDs) also produce an amplified analog current in response to light absorption.  However, in an APD, the total gain is much lower and the excess noise factor much higher.  Conversely, quantum efficiency can be higher and dark noise lower.

See also
 Photomultiplier tube

References

 Technology of Broadcom-SiPM
 SensL Technical Note
 Hamamatsu Technical Note

Optoelectronics
Silicon photonics devices
Particle detectors
Photomultipliers

de:Photomultiplier#Alternativen